The National Standard for Incident Recording is used in England and Wales to standardise the collection of information by police force about most types of incident reported to them. The National Standard for Incident Recording is sometimes confused with The National Crime Recording Standard.

National standard for incident recording 

The National Standard for Incident Recording includes a ' National Incident Category List'. The standard requires a police force to record the types of incident included on that list.

The five purposes for the National Standard for Incident Recording are,

(1) To provide uniformity about how the police record an incident.

(2) To ensure the correct response to an incident reported to the police.

(3) To allow a risk assessment about the incident, particularly considering any threats to safety, identifying vulnerable people, and repeat victims.

(4) An opportunity to find any incidents that required recording as a notifiable offence.

(5) To provide management and performance data for use at both a local and national level.

It was mentioned that 80% of calls to the police were about incidents specified on the 'National Incident Category List'.

Compliance 
In 2009, the National Police Improvement agency reported inconsistencies about how police forces collected data about incidents reported to it. In the report it recommended the need rationalise and simplify the systems for collecting incident data.

In 2012, Her Majesty's Inspectorate of Constabulary audited several police forces about how they recorded incidents. A report by Her Majesty's Inspectorate of Constabulary said that the recording lacked consistency.  It was concerned about the adequacy and quality of the data, especially in identifying vulnerable and repeat victims, particularly in relation to anti-social behaviour incidents.

Ongoing assessment
Her Majesty’s Inspectorate of Constabulary and Fire and Rescue annually complete a ‘PEEL Assessment’ for each English and Welsh police force. The assessment reviews a police forces effectiveness, efficiency, and legitimacy. A police force is graded either outstanding, good, requires improvement, or inadequate. The National Standard for Incident Recording are still used, but how it complies with the aims of standard are incorporated into the PEEL Assessment, by for example, how it uses information to identify repeat victims, vulnerable people, and to improve the  management and performance by the police force.

References 

Governance of policing in England
Governance of policing in Wales
Governance of policing in the United Kingdom